Serpico is a 1973 American neo-noir biographical crime drama film directed by Sidney Lumet and starring Al Pacino in the title role. The screenplay was adapted by Waldo Salt and Norman Wexler from the book of the same name written by Peter Maas with the assistance of its subject, Frank Serpico. The story details Serpico's struggle with corruption within the New York City Police Department during his eleven years of service, and his work as a whistleblower that led to the investigation by the Knapp Commission.

Producer Dino De Laurentiis purchased the rights from Maas. Agent Martin Bregman joined the film as co-producer. Bregman suggested Pacino for the main part, and John G. Avildsen was hired to direct the film. Pacino met with Serpico to prepare for the role early in the summer of 1973. After Avildsen was dismissed, Lumet was hired as his replacement. On a short notice, he selected the shooting locations and organized the scenes; the production was filmed in July and August.

Upon its release, Serpico became a critical and commercial success. At the same time, the film drew criticism from police officers. It received nominations for the Academy Awards and BAFTA Awards. Pacino earned the Golden Globe Award for Best Actor – Motion Picture Drama, while Salt and Wexler received the Writers Guild of America Award for Best Adapted Screenplay.

Plot 
NYPD Officer Frank Serpico is rushed to the hospital, having been shot in the face. Chief Sidney Green fears that Serpico was shot by another cop. The rest of the film is shown as a long flashback.

Serpico graduates from the police academy with big ideas for improving the police force's community relations. He dresses like an actual civilian instead of wearing the department's standard plainclothes dress, which is easily recognizable. While he is chasing a burglar, other officers fail to recognize him as one of their own, and shoot at him. He realizes that deviating from protocols can be dangerous.

Serpico reports an attempted bribe to a high-ranking investigator, who chuckles and advises him to keep the money. Serpico soon learns that corruption is rampant in the police department. Forced to accompany officers as they collect payoffs from criminals and small businesses, Serpico refuses to accept his share of the money. He makes several attempts to alert superiors to the corruption but is rebuffed every time. Other officers learn that he is reporting them and he begins to fear for his life.

Serpico and his well-connected friend Blair go to the mayor's assistant, who promises a real investigation and support but is stymied by political pressure. Ostracized, frustrated, and fearful, Serpico sinks into depression, which ruins his relationship with his girlfriend. He begins brutalizing well-connected suspects who had been bribing other officers and thought themselves protected. Finally, Serpico informs McClain that he has reported his experiences to oversight agencies outside the police force. Furious, McClain informs the other officers.

Blair uses his connections to arrange a personal interview with the district attorney, who tell Serpico that if he testifies to a grand jury, a major investigation will follow. The DA limits his questions and prevents Serpico from revealing the ubiquity of corruption in the police force. Serpico and Blair take their story to The New York Times. After his allegations are printed, his superiors retaliate by assigning him to a dangerous narcotics squad in Brooklyn.

During a raid on a drug trafficker's apartment, Serpico's partners hold back at a critical moment and Serpico gets shot in the face. After a long, painful recovery, he testifies before the Knapp Commission, a government inquiry into NYPD corruption. An epilogue states that Frank Serpico resigned from the NYPD on June 15, 1972, was awarded the NYPD Medal of Honor for "conspicuous bravery in action", and moved to Switzerland.

Cast 

 Al Pacino as Detective Frank Serpico
 John Randolph as Chief Sidney Green
 Jack Kehoe as Tom Keough
 Biff McGuire as Captain Inspector McClain
 Barbara Eda-Young as Laurie
 Cornelia Sharpe as Leslie
 Edward Grover as Inspector Lombardo
 Tony Roberts as Bob Blair
 Allan Rich as District Attorney Herman Tauber
 Albert Henderson as Peluce
 Joseph Bova as Potts
 Alan North as Brown
 Woodie King Jr. as Larry
 James Tolkan as Lieutenant Steiger
 Bernard Barrow as Inspector Roy Palmer
 Nathan George as Lieutenant Nate Smith
 M. Emmet Walsh as Gallagher
 Ted Beniades as Al Sarno
 F. Murray Abraham as Serpico's partner (uncredited)
 Judd Hirsch as hospital police guard (uncredited)

Background 
After Frank Serpico recovered from being shot, he helped Peter Maas write Serpico. Detective David Durk, who also appeared in front of the Knapp Commission, planned to sell the rights of their story for a film adaptation. Early negotiations included Paul Newman in the role of Durk, and Robert Redford as Serpico. Serpico distanced himself from the project, as he felt that he would be merely portrayed as a sidekick. Script writer John Gregory Dunne turned down the project, as he felt "there was no story". Director Sam Peckinpah, as well as Newman and Redford left the project.

After the success of several of his films in the 1960s, and the first years of the 1970s, producer Dino De Laurentiis decided to move from Italy to the United States. The change in financing laws further regulated the Italian film industry, and the producer settled in New York City. Following their collaboration on The Valachi Papers, De Laurentiis purchased the rights to Maas' book. Maas received US$400,000 (equivalent to $ million in ) and participation in the film, while the rights for his work were secured before the March 1973 publication of the book. Initially, De Laurentiis' found resistance to the project from Paramount Pictures. The studio considered that "enough cop movies" had been made. In turn, De Laurentiis was supported by Charles Bluhdorn, president of Gulf+Western who wanted the film to be made. De Laurentiis later declared that "no American producer would have had the courage" to depict police corruption in a motion picture.

Maas' agent, Sam Cohn, was approached by agent Martin Bregman. Bregman expressed his interest to also produce the film after reading an article in New York magazine about the book. Bregman proposed one of his signed actors, Al Pacino to play the lead. Waldo Salt was chosen to write the screenplay adaptation. The first draft did not impress Maas, De Laurentiis, nor Bregman. Bregman felt that the result was "very political", and that the story did not reflect what the producers desired to portray on the film. Bregman and Maas then directed Salt to the parts of the book they envisioned to be reflected on the screenplay. The second draft was considered a substantial improvement by the production team. Bregman took the treatment to Pacino, who initially did not find the film interesting. Salt then visited Pacino with the re-worked script, that convinced him to consider the part. A meeting with Serpico, Maas and Pacino was then arranged for the actor to meet the subject of the film. Upon meeting him, Pacino was fully convinced to accept the part. John G. Avildsen was then chosen to direct the film.

Salt's work did not satisfy Avildsen, who threatened to leave the project unless he could bring Norman Wexler to write the screenplay. They had previously worked together in Avildsen's Joe. Both then traveled to Switzerland, to visit Serpico at home, and work the details. Time to work on the production was constricted due to Pacino's commitment to The Godfather Part II. Further disagreement arose between Avildsen and Bregman regarding the script, and then the selection of the filming locations. Upon finding resistance to his plans, Avildsen threatened Bregman of quitting multiple times. An aggravated Bregman then called for a meeting with the production team, in order to cause the director to quit in front of witnesses. Avildsen had insisted on a meeting with Bregman and De Laurentiis to shoot a scene in the real home of Serpico's parents for authenticity. The producers felt that the structure could not accommodate the production team and equipment efficiently. The escalating tension on the meeting resulted in De Laurentiis firing Avildsen, and the director quit in return. Avildsen's account for the reason of his dismissal was refusing to cast Cornelia Sharpe as Leslie. Sharpe was at the time dating Bregman. Avildsen would later declare that he should have treated the situation "with more finesse". Sidney Lumet was then hired to complete the job for his reputation as an effective director under a tight schedule.

Pacino was shortly distracted from the project by an offer to play the lead in Lenny, but ultimately he turned it down. To prepare for Serpico, he rode with police officers for a night, but he decided it was not enough. A method actor, he felt that he needed to spend time with Serpico. Pacino and Serpico met several times in Montauk, New York, where the actor rented a house for the summer season. Pacino was moved by Serpico's conviction to reform the NYPD, and became more committed to the project. In character, Pacino often walked through areas of the city that were considered dangerous at the time. While waiting in traffic, he attempted to arrest a truck driver, as he was enraged by the exhaust fumes. He was refused service at a Manhattan restaurant for the appearance he kept for the film.

Production
Lumet organized the 107 speaking parts that took place in 104 different locations. The longest scenes took up two-and-a-half pages of the screenplay, while the average was one page. A budget of $3.3 million (equivalent to $ million in ) was assigned. Two weeks of rehearsal were held. Pacino had learned Salt's screenplay, and he agreed with Lumet that Wexler's revised version improved the structure, but that the dialogue was impoverished. Lumet allowed the actors to improvise certain dialogues, and he also allowed their creative input for the scenes. The cast selected dialogues from both scripts as the filming progressed. Though he had already a good knowledge of New York locations, Lumet considered the work "physically brutal, and emotionally tough". The principal photography on Serpico began in early July 1973. The film was planned to be released before Christmas, with four-and-a-half months for the crew to complete the movie. Filming took place in July and August. The story of the film encompassed eleven years, from 1960 through 1971.

To accommodate the scenes around Pacino's facial hair, the film was shot in reverse. Pacino started with long beard and hair. He was shaved to a mustache, and then eventually his hair was cut, and he was clean-shaven for the beginning of the film. Lumet decided each day if Pacino was to be further shaven, and the crew prepared fake beards in case they were required. Winter conditions were simulated, as the team had to defoliate trees and cut shrubs. Special make-up was used to absorb the sweat, and to keep the actors' skin dry. The cast wore winter coats, and their skin was made to look bluish, while their breath had to be visible. The director followed Serpico's desire for the winter to look "cold and heavy", and the summer "idyllic and hazy". The team had difficulty to find locations suitable for the scenes set in the 1960s, since graffiti did not become common until 1970. Lumet shot up to thirty-five different setups daily. The team had to move three times a day on an average. Each location had to be cleared of cars that did not belong to the particular period, and extras could not feature long hair, or non-period wardrobe. Hairdressers were present with the crew. Multiple locations in the city including Harlem, South Bronx, Bedford–Stuyvesant, Brooklyn and Astoria, Queens were used. Lewisohn Stadium was featured shortly before its demolition. The party scene was shot at Sidney Kingsley's fifth avenue loft. The NYPD cooperated with the director, and allowed him to film in four active police stations.

Serpico's apartment had to be built by the crew. It featured a fixed ceiling, and movable walls. As Serpico's original apartment, it was located in Greenwich Village. Through lighting, Lumet and cinematographer Arthur Ornitz chose to maintain a "warm look" on the location. Different techniques were used to reflect moods, and the changes that the character went through the years. Lumet focused on portraying Serpico's struggle to balance his work and personal life, and his increased isolation and alienation, as his efforts produced slow results. The director decided to portray him "darker and darker". As the film progressed, the cast costumes became darker in color, until the courtroom scene, where all the actors wore dark tones. Lumet told Charles Champlin: "I was trying to negate color, to make a picture in color that was not colorful". Meanwhile, he desired Serpico's fellow officers to be "men with charm, who were all the more evil for being human and understandable". Lumet finished shooting the film in fifty-one days, on budget.

The film was edited by Dede Allen. Allen received the scenes from Lumet directly after they were shot. She had a limit of forty-eight hours to finish her work for its delivery to the sound department. Lumet did not want to add a score to the picture, but he decided he would do it before De Laurentiis commissioned one. He learned that Mikis Theodorakis was released from prison in Greece. He was able to locate him in Paris, as the composer quickly left his country of origin. Theodorakis accepted Lumet's offer, and flew to New York City the next day. He met with the director, who played the movie for him the day of his arrival. Theodorakis agreed that it should not have a soundtrack, but he offered a composition of his to add to the film. Theodorakis had arranged a tour of the United States with a Greek orchestra and told Lumet that he could not be present for the spotting session. Lumet offered the help of Bob James, who would sit with the director for the spotting. To inform of the progress of the sessions and possible changes on the arrangements, James flew to the cities where Theodorakis appeared in order to work the details together.

Release
The film was released on December 5, 1973 in New York, and on December 18 in Los Angeles. The opening week in New York garnered $123,000. Serpico was released nationwide on February 6, 1974. The film was a critical and commercial success. It grossed between $23.4 million and $29.8 million.

Serpico attended the premiere of the film, but he did not finish watching it. Serpico felt "distant" from the end results. On an interview with Pauline Kael for The New Yorker, he concluded that it "didn't give a sense of frustration you feel when you're not able to do anything". According to Lumet's account, he met Serpico shortly before the production. The director asked him to stay clear of the set, to not make Pacino "self-conscious" regarding his portrayal. Serpico watched the film in its entirety for the first time in 2010. In a later interview, he declared that Lumet barred him from the set after he interrupted the shooting of a scene that "never happened". Serpico also criticized the dismissal of Avildsen by the production team. Serpico and Avildsen remained friends, and shared a property on Long Island for three years in the 1980s. New York City Police Commissioner Michael Codd stated that the film "tends to imply that Serpico was the only honest cop in the whole department". Detective Durk was not pleased with Serpico. Durk, who was depicted in the character of Bob Blair, felt that the movie would deter other policemen to denounce corruption. On an interview with The New York Times, he considered that the movie was unfair to honest police officers. Durk stated that the end of the film conveyed that "the cost of honesty is martyrdom", and Serpico's departure for Switzerland showed him "wounded and frustrated". Meanwhile, Bronx district attorney Burton B. Roberts declared that it "bears absolutely no relationship to the truth". Lumet defended his artistic license on the portrayal of the story, as he felt he desired to make a film that "people believed in". Bregman dismissed the critics, as he felt that the real names were not relevant for viewers in cities outside New York. Maas dismissed Durk's claims regarding honest policemen and asked "where were they?"

Critical reception

Premiere reception
The New York Times felt that the film was "galvanizing" for Pacino's performance, and by the "tremendous intensity" of Lumet's direction. The publication considered the film at the same time "disquieting" for its use of fictional names, as the reviewer felt that it diminished the role of Durk. Meanwhile, it called Theodorakis' soundtrack "redundant and dumb". The New York Daily News delivered a favorable review of the film. It rated it four stars out of five, and called it "a triumph of  intelligence, compassion and style". A follow-up critic by the publication deemed Pacino's acting a "masterful performance", as the reviewer remarked "he walks like a cop. He talks like a cop. He even seems to think as a cop". The review also praised Lumet and his "talent for achieving social realism". The Record considered it "one of the finest films of the year". While it felt that the portrayal of Serpico was "too righteous and obsessive", the review favored Pacino, but felt that his performance was "sometimes a little too intense". It praised the photography of New York City as authentic, and credited Ornitz and Allen's work for it. The Village Voice wrote a mixed review. It criticized the focus of the film on Serpico, and the minor role the screenplay writers gave to the character that represented Durk. The reviewer considered that Serpico was "worth seeing" for Pacino's performance. Variety deemed Pacino's acting "outstanding", and Lumet's a combination of "gritty action and thought-provoking comment".
For Newhouse News Services it was an "exciting movie", but the review remarked that it was "weakened" by its focus on Serpico. The news agency attributed the minimization of the other characters to avoid "possible lawsuits". The Los Angeles Times acclaimed Serpico. Charles Champlin called Pacino "one of the handful of genuine star actors in American films". Salt and Wexler's screenplay was hailed as "almost documentary reality", and its treatment of the main character "a complex and evolving portrait". The reviewer also remarked that the romances and break-ups were presented with "unhackneyed honesty". The contributions of the supporting cast were well noted. Champlin felt that Allen's work was considered to be "high on the list" for an Academy Award nomination and deemed Theodorakis' music "effective".

Wide release reception
Gene Siskel of the Chicago Tribune gave the film three-and-a-half stars, noting its treatment of corruption as its "principal strength and weakness" and adding that Serpico "loses the perspective" that  "corruption ... begins and ends with individuals making active and passive decisions". The Philadelphia Inquirer celebrated the film's critic of police corruption, despite its "embellishments and omissions" on the story. Pacino's performance was called "riveting", and the piece praised the "sharply individualized characterizations" by Tony Roberts, Jack Kehoe, John Randolph, Biff McGuire, Barbara Eda-Young and Cornelia Sharpe. Meanwhile, also for Philadelphia Inquirer, investigative journalist Greg Walter lamented its portrayal of police officers as "snarling, insipid ass(es)". Walter felt that Maas' book was "coldly objective", but that the director's work delivered characters that were "one-dimensional caricatures". The Boston Globe welcomed Lumet's "melodramatic efficiency". The publication considered the story "heavily repetitious", but favored its "quick pace". It regarded Ornitz's camerawork as "the right documentary look", while it lamented Theodorakis' score as "disruptive" and "out of character". Esquire further criticized Theodorakis, as the reviewer opined that his "composing voice ought to be silenced". Meanwhile, the piece praised Allen's work.

The Miami Herald hailed the use of "street talk" instead of the "language of actors and actresses" by Salt, Wexler and Maas. It praised Lumet and Ornitz's photography that "generate the smells, sounds and styles of the city". It considered Pacino's acting  "predictably excellent", and it favored Theodorakis' music. The Detroit Free Press suggested that Serpico would be a breakthrough role for Pacino as an actor, and called his work "fascinating". The newspaper defined the film as an "encouraging morality tale". Meanwhile, San Francisco Examiner observed Pacino's acting to be "a brilliant, solidly thought out performance". The publication added that the supporting cast's contributions "never satisfactorily fleshed out". Regarding Lumet, the reviewer felt that he directed the film with "skill and vigor". The Cincinnati Enquirer attributed the commercial success of the film to Pacino's acting, and to the film's depiction of "hard, cold, grit and grime reality".

For The Evening Sun reviewer Lou Cedrone expressed his doubts about Durk's "gratis talk of defamation of the police image". Cedrone considered that Durk "comes off very nicely" on the film, and defended Lumet's choice to "emphasize the action rather than the definition". Meanwhile, it viewed the use of "Neapolitan" music as "foolish perhaps, but not touching". It declared Pacino's contribution "a magnificent performance". The Pittsburgh Post-Gazette found Serpico to be "meticulously crafted, intelligently written, unflinchingly honest". The publication noted the "fidelity" with which the director captured New York, and that the city "becomes more than just a background". It summed Pacino's acting as "naturalistic, flawlessly convincing". The Honolulu Advertiser attributed Pacino's "brilliant portrayal" to turn an "ordinary cop movie" into "extraordinary". The review favored Lumet, the writers and the supporting cast.

The Austin American-Statesman highlighted realism in producing a "fascinating film". The Fort Worth Star-Telegram celebrated Pacino's "towering performance". Roberts' performance was noted as a "standout". Sharpe and Eda Young's appearances as Serpico's love interests were deemed to be "played with restrained excellence". The newspaper opined that the film was "15 minutes too long", but that viewers would not "realize the length until you're outside looking at your watch". The Kansas City Star detailed the criticism the film received from police officers, and Serpico's discontent with the production. The piece noted that despite the fictional additions, Serpico was a "superrealistic dramatization". Meanwhile, Wexler and Salt were praised for the authentic use of profanity in the dialogues. The Times opened its review applauding Serpico's denunciation of police corruption, while it pointed that the film "exceeds (the) expectations" of the viewers for it to be "powerfully dramatic". Lumet's "accurate eye for surroundings" was remarked, and the reviewer hailed Pacino and the supporting cast.

Later reviews
On the review aggregator Metacritic the movie garnered a score of 87 out of 100, based on 7 reviews from mainstream critics. The result indicated "universal acclaim". Rotten Tomatoes rated it 91% "Fresh" with an average score of 8.1/10, based on reviews from forty-four critics. The website remarked Pacino's "ferocious performance". 

AllMovie gave Serpico five stars out of five. The review described the situation in the United States following the Watergate scandal, and how the "bureaucratic depravity touched a cultural nerve". It welcomed the film's "documentary-style realism". The A.V. Club received it positively, the reviewer  felt that Serpico expressed  "artful, character-driven slices of life". In its later review, The Village Voice declared that the "Watergate-era time capsule of hippie fashions" that the film presented "ought to look pretty dated", but that the story "feels depressingly relevant".

Legacy
On September 21, 1975, Serpico was premiered on television on The ABC Sunday Night Movie. It was released on VHS in 1991, and on DVD in 2002. The film was then made available in Blu-ray in 2013. Masters of Cinema released Serpico in the United Kingdom on Blu-ray in 2014. It contained three video documentaries about the film, a photo gallery with an audio commentary by Lumet and a forty-four page booklet.

A television series based on Maas' book and the motion picture was broadcast on NBC between September 1976 and January 1977, with David Birney playing the role of Serpico. Fourteen episodes were broadcast, and one was never aired. The series was preceded by a pilot film, Serpico: The Deadly Game, which was broadcast in April 1976.

The 1976 Italian film The Cop in Blue Jeans''' main character was inspired by Serpico. In the 1977 film Saturday Night Fever, a poster of Serpico is featured in the room of its main character, Tony Manero. The film is referenced in 1994's Natural Born Killers by the character Dwight McClusky. The poster of the film is featured in the room of the main character of 1997's Boogie Nights. Serpico was mentioned in the 1995 film Get Shorty. In a 2004 Corner Gas episode, "The Taxman", local cops Davis and Karen talk about the film and Karen tries to rent it at the video store. In a 2007 episode of It’s Always Sunny in Philadelphia, "Bums: Making a Mess All Over the City", Charlie imitates Pacino’s performance after the gang buys an out of commission police car. The film was referenced in a 2016 episode of El ministerio del tiempo as the reason for the nickname of one of its main characters, "Pacino". Among other police films, Serpico influenced the Hong Kong action cinema.

Accolades
The film received Academy Awards nominations for Best Actor (Al Pacino) and Best Adapted Screenplay. The script won the Writers Guild of America Award for Best Adapted Screenplay. Theodorakis was nominated for both the Grammy Award for Best Score Soundtrack for Visual Media and the BAFTA Award for Best Film Music. Sidney Lumet was nominated for the BAFTA Award for Best Direction and the Directors Guild of America Award. The film was nominated for the Golden Globe Award for Best Motion Picture – Drama. Pacino won his first Golden Globe award for Best Actor in 1974. For his performance, he also received a BAFTA nomination for Best Actor in a Leading Role.

Pacino's role as Frank Serpico ranked at number forty on the American Film Institute's AFI's 100 Years...100 Heroes & Villains. Meanwhile, Serpico also ranked at number eighty-four on AFI's AFI's 100 Years...100 Cheers'', a list of America's most inspiring films.

References

Citations

Sources

External links 
 
 
 
 

1973 films
1973 crime drama films
1970s biographical drama films
1970s English-language films
1970s police films
American biographical drama films
American crime drama films
American neo-noir films
American police detective films
Crime films based on actual events
Drama films based on actual events
Films about the New York City Police Department
Films about police corruption
Films about police misconduct
Films about whistleblowing
Films adapted into television shows
Films based on biographies
Films directed by Sidney Lumet
Films featuring a Best Drama Actor Golden Globe winning performance
Films produced by Martin Bregman
Films scored by Mikis Theodorakis
Films set in the 1960s
Films set in the 1970s
Films set in New York City
Films shot in New York City
Films with screenplays by Waldo Salt
Films with screenplays by Norman Wexler
New York City Police Department corruption and misconduct
Paramount Pictures films
1970s American films
Films about corruption in the United States